Vercomaris is a genus of sea snails, marine gastropod mollusks in the family Cancellariidae, the nutmeg snails.

Species
Species within the genus Vercomaris include:

 Vercomaris pergradata (Verco, 1904)

References

Cancellariidae
Monotypic gastropod genera